Kurt August Hirsch (12 January 1906 – 4 November 1986) was a German mathematician who moved to England to escape the Nazi persecution of Jews. His research was in group theory. He also worked to reform mathematics education and became a county chess champion. The Hirsch length and Hirsch–Plotkin radical are named after him.

He taught at the University of Leicester from 1938 (except for a brief internment as an enemy alien in 1940), moved to King's College, Newcastle in 1948, and then moved again to Queen Mary College in London in 1951, where he stayed for the remainder of his career and worked with K. W. Gruenberg.

Hirsch's doctoral students include Ismail Mohamed and Ascher Wagner.

Publications
He translated several books from Russian, including:
 The Theory of Groups (by Aleksandr Kurosh). His first translation
 Algebraic Geometry (by Shafarevich). This was later retranslated by Miles Reid

References

External links
 Author profile at Mathematical Reviews (subscription required).

1906 births
1986 deaths
Humboldt University of Berlin alumni
20th-century German mathematicians
20th-century British mathematicians
Jewish emigrants from Nazi Germany to the United Kingdom
People interned in the Isle of Man during World War II